Life Changes is the sixth studio album by German DJ Sash!. It was released worldwide on 8 November 2013 by Tokapi Recordings. The record includes collaborations with Jessy De Smet and with Tony T. The album also released two singles, "Summer's Gone" in October 2013 and "Can't Change You" in March 2014.

Track listing

Personnel
Sash! – producer
Tokapi – producer
Ralf Kappmeier – songwriter
Thomas Alisson – songwriter
Sascha Lappessen – songwriter
Beatrice Thomas – vocalist
Bo – vocalist
Jessy – vocalist
Leo Rojas – vocalist
Peter Maria – vocalist
Plexiphones – vocalist
Tony T. – vocalist

References

External links

2013 albums
Sash! albums